The Hanlin Academy was an academic and administrative institution of higher learning founded in the 8th century Tang China by Emperor Xuanzong in Chang'an.

Membership in the academy was confined to an elite group of scholars, who performed secretarial and literary tasks for the court. One of its primary duties was to decide on an interpretation of the Chinese classics. This formed the basis of the Imperial examinations, which aspiring government bureaucrats had to pass to attain higher-level government posts. Painters working for the court were also attached to the academy.

Academy members
Some of the more famous academicians of Hanlin were:
 Li Bai (701–762) – Poet
 Bai Juyi (772–846) – Poet
 Yan Shu (991–1055) – Poet, calligrapher, (prime minister, 1042)
 Ouyang Xiu (1007–1072) – Historian
 Shen Kuo (1031–1095) – Chancellor
 Zhang Zeduan (1085–1145) – Painter
 Zhao Mengfu (1254–1322) – Painter, calligrapher, poet (rector, 1314–1320)
 Huang Zicheng (1350–1402) – Imperial scholar
 Li Dongyang (1447–1516) – Imperial officer, poet, served as 'Grand Historian'
 Ni Yuanlu (1593–1644) – Calligrapher, painter, high-ranking official
 Wu Renchen (1628–1689) – Historian and mathematician
 Chen Menglei (1650–1741) – Scholar, writer (Editor in Chief of the Gujin Tushu Jicheng)
 Zhang Tingyu (1672–1755) – Politician and historian
 Ji Xiaolan (1724–1805) – Scholar, poet (Editor in Chief of the Siku Quanshu)
 Yao Nai (1731–1815) – Scholar
 Gao E (1738–1815) – Scholar and editor
 He Changling (1785–1848) – Scholar and official
 Zeng Guofan (1811–1872) – Scholar and later key military official
 Chen Lanbin (1816–1895) – Diplomat (ambassador to the U.S., Spain and Peru)
 Weng Tonghe (1830–1904) – Imperial Tutor
 Cai Yuanpei (1868–1940) – Educator
 Qu Hongji (1850–1918) – Politician

Bureau of Translators
Subordinated to the Hanlin Academy was the Bureau of Translators. Founded by the Ming dynasty in 1407, after the first expedition of Zheng He to the Indian Ocean, the Bureau dealt with the memorials delivered by foreign ambassadors and trained foreign language specialists. It included departments for many languages such as the Jurchen, "Tartar" (Mongol), Korean, Ryukyuan, Japanese,
 Tibetan, "Huihui" (the "Muslim" language, Persian) Vietnamese and Burmese languages, as well as for the languages of the "various barbarian tribes" (Bai yi 百夷, i.e., Shan ethnic groups on China's southwestern borders), "Gaochang" (people of Turfan, i.e. Old Uyghur language), and Xitian (西天; (Sanskrit, spoken in India). In 1511 and 1579 departments for the languages of Ba bai (八百; Lao) and Thai were added, respectively. A Malay language vocabulary (Manlajia Guan Yiyu) 滿剌加館譯語 (Words-list of Melaka Kingdom) for the Malay spoken in the Malacca Sultanate was compiled. A Cham language vocabulary 占城館 was created for the language spoken in the Champa Kingdom.

When the Qing dynasty revived the Ming Siyiguan 四夷館, the Manchus, who "were sensitive to references to barbarians", changed the name from yi 夷 "barbarian" to yi 彝 "Yi people", and changed the Shan exonym from Baiyi 百夷 "hundred barbarians" to Baiyi 百譯 "hundred translations".

The later Tongwen Guan set up by the Qing dynasty for translating western languages was subordinated to the Zongli Yamen and not the Hanlin.

1900 fire

The Beijing Hanlin Academy and its library were severely damaged in a fire during the siege of the International Legations in Peking (now known as Beijing) in 1900 by the Kansu Braves while fighting against the Eight-Nation Alliance. On June 24, the fire spread to the academy:

The flames destroyed many ancient texts.

The academy operated continuously until its closure during the 1911 Xinhai Revolution.

See also 
 Academia Sinica
 Academies of Classical Learning
 Chen Cheng (Ming dynasty)
 Chinese Academy of Sciences
 Chinese Academy of Social Sciences
 Education in China

References

Further reading

External links

Foreign language vocabularies

wikisource:zh:華夷譯語 – 達達館（蒙古語）Mongol language
華夷譯語(一) – 暹羅館（泰語） 天文門。 Thai language
華夷譯語(二) – 緬甸館譯語 緬甸館來文（緬甸語）通用門。Burmese language
華夷譯語(三) – 百夷館（雲南傣語）天文門。Baiyi (Dai, Shan)
華夷譯語(四) – 百夷館（雲南傣語）天文門和地理門。Baiyi (Dai, Shan)
華夷譯語(五) – 回回館《回回館雜字》（波斯語）天文門。Persian language
華夷譯語(六) – 回回館《回回館雜字》（波斯語）天文門和地理門。Persian language
高昌館來文 – 高昌館來文（高昌）回鶻語 (畏兀兒館（回鶻語）。Old Uyghur language
譯文備覽 – 譯文備覽 西番館（藏語）。Tibetan language
西番譯語 – 《西番譯語》西番館（藏語）Tibetan language
wikisource:zh:華夷譯語/朝鮮館譯語 Korean language
wikisource:zh:使琉球錄 (陳侃)#.E5.A4.B7.E8.AA.9E.EF.BC.88.E9.99.84.EF.BC.89 Ryukyuan language
wikisource:zh:使琉球錄 (蕭崇業)/附#.E5.A4.B7.E8.AA.9E – 使琉球錄 夷語 夷字 Ryukyuan language
wikisource:zh:使琉球錄 (夏子陽)/卷下#.E5.A4.B7.E8.AA.9E.E3.80.90.E9.99.84.E3.80.91 Ryukyuan language
wikisource:zh:中山傳信錄/卷六#.E9.A2.A8.E4.BF.97 Ryukyuan language
wikisource:zh:重修使琉球錄 Ryukyuan language
使琉球录三种-夷语（附）_国学导航 Ryukyuan language
0-使琉球录-明-陈侃  Ryukyuan language
國朝典故卷之一百二　　使琉球錄（明）陳侃 撰 Ryukyuan language
 《女直館》（女真語） 《女真譯語》《女真館雜字》在 Die Sprache und Schrift der Jučen by Wilhem Grube by Wilhem Grube 《女真文和女真語》作者：葛祿博   Jurchen language

8th-century establishments in China
1911 disestablishments in China
Confucian education
Education in Beijing
Government of Imperial China
History of education in China
 
Song dynasty
Tang dynasty